Atif Tauqeer (born 23 July 1979), is a Pakistani journalist, poet, writer, vlogger and media researcher based in Germany.

Education
Tauqeer got his bachelor's degree in political science and master's degree in mass communication from the University of Karachi. In 2012 he got another master's degree in international media studies from the University of Bonn, Germany.

Poetry
Atif Tauqeer is one of the notable Urdu poets. He has been in Urdu literature scene since early 1990s but he was first noticed when he wrote his famous poem “Shukria” in October 1999 in the context of Pakistani military general Pervez Musharraf’s martial law.
In that poem he criticizes military’s role in Politics. 
Many of his poems have 
 "Aytaraf" (Confession)
 "Talibani Darinday" (Tablian Beasts)
 "Mutaliba" (Demand)

References 

1979 births
Living people
Pakistani journalists
People from Jhelum District
Pakistani poets
University of Karachi alumni
University of Bonn alumni
Urdu-language poets from Pakistan